The Chillout Project: House Sessions is the fourth volume of Anton Ramos' The Chillout Project series.

Track listing
 Solu Music Feat. Kimblee - Fade (Earth Mix)
 Avalanches - A Different Feeling
 DJ Drunken Monkey - Gratification (Hawke Blue Resurrection Mix)
 David Guetta - You Are The Music
 Rise Ashen - Second Wind
 Sublevel - Just Us
 Amma - Heartbeat (Andy Caldwell Mix)
 Kaskade - What You Are To Me
 Spencer Gray Feat. Heather Johnson - Pillow Talk (La Version Du Project Ananda)
 Gaelle - Rain (Speakeasy Remix)
 Me'Shell NdegéOcello - Earth (Ben Watt Lazy Dog Remix)
 Mimosa Feat. Angie Giles - Say You'll Be Mine (Original Mix)
 Groove Armada - Love Box
 Miguel Migs - The Night
 Heather Headley - I Wish I Wasn't (Vocal Mix)
 Solid Sessions Feat. Pronti and Kalmani - Janeiro (Lounge Conjunction Mix)

2003 compilation albums
The Chillout Project albums